Poly-clip System is a German family-owned company based in Hattersheim near Frankfurt am Main. Poly-clip System is the largest provider of clip closure systems worldwide and the world market leader and hidden champion in this sector of the food industry and packaging industry.

Company history 

The founding of the Oswald Niedecker Metallwarenfabrik oHG in Frankfurt/Main dates back to 1 March 1922. The company initially manufactured tools for the processing and forming of sheet metal. From 1932 onwards, Niedecker has been a successful lead seal manufacturer in Germany and has already gained experience with closure systems; the basis of today's clip closure. In 1948, after the death of her husband, Elisabeth Niedecker took over the management of the company. From 1950, punched and formed parts, mainly parts for brakes for the automotive industry are produced. In 1952, Herbert Niedecker, the son of the founder, takes charge of the company and its 50 employees. During an exhibition in 1957, the idea of closing sausages with metal clips was born. The trademark poly-clip was registered in 1958. The parent company of today's Poly-clip System, Niedecker Verschlußtechnik GmbH (NVT), was then founded in 1959. In 1962, the company participated for the first time in the industry's leading exhibition IFFA in Frankfurt. For reasons of capacity, the production of clips was moved to Gedern in 1970. In 1972, the registered trade mark poly-clip was announced worldwide. In 1990, Frank Niedecker takes over the management and pushes the internationalization of the company. From 1991, the company appears under the brand name Poly-clip System. In 2003, Joachim Meyrahn was appointed President/CEO. In 2011, the company moved to its new headquarters in Hattersheim am Main.

Developments and patents 
In 1933, Oswald Niedecker received the Patent for his security seal.() This closure can be applied without the use of tools and is tamper-proof, as the seal is destroyed when opened. In 1957, the reel clip (R-clip) was developed for closing sausage and similar products.() This was followed by the development of a machine that enables the clean stripping of the sausage ends by means of a voiding separator() and the simultaneous closing of the two ends of a sausage() Both processes combined in one automatic clipper revolutionized the worldwide production of sausages to the automatic production of portioned sausages as early as 1967 with the FCA 3401 automatic filling clipping machine. In 1999, the patent for a safety coating for clips was granted.() This SAFE-COAT safety coating ensures that the consumables clips are food safe on the customer's product. In 2007 the new generation of reel clips, the R-ID clip, followed, which enables bacteria-proof clip closures.() The R-ID generation also includes the clip spool with transponder (RFID)() and the clipping machines with RFID technology, which recognize clip and closing tools and thus ensure overall safety in the production process.() The company has a total of more than 800 patents.

Products 

The product and service range consists of clipping machines, packaging machines and their automation, consumables and services. The SGS Institut Fresenius certifies consumables, which are awarded the SGS Institut Fresenius quality seal. The core of the certification is the testing of the products for food safety (SAFE-COAT, ISO 22000, Halal).

Applications 
Originally developed for the meat processing industry and the butcher's trade, the system is used in both the food and non-food sectors,  and in other industries that process or pack paste products. In addition to tubular bags which are closed with a clip at each end, bags are also closed with a clip, e.g. for packaging whole poultry.

Locations 
The machines and consumables are produced at four locations in Germany, Austria and Brazil. Poly-clip System belongs to a group of companies with over 1000 employees worldwide. The group of companies has 31 distribution companies internationally and sales partners in almost all countries of the world.

See also

Sources

References

External links 

 

Engineering companies of Germany
Food technology
Construction equipment manufacturers of Germany
Privately held companies of Germany
Holding companies of Germany
German brands
Packaging companies of Germany
Meat packing industry
Mechanical engineering
Manufacturing companies established in 1922
Companies based in Hesse
Main-Taunus-Kreis